Jean-Claude Muaka is a French comedian and actor who was born on November 14, 1986. He has made a name for himself in classic plays, stand-up comedy, and in cinema.

Biography 

Jean-Claude Muaka was born in Villeneuve-Saint-Georges, his family moved to  Vaux-le-Pénil, in Seine-et-Marne, when he was 7 years old. His father is a Physician, and his mother is a nurse; both are from the Democratic Republic of the Congo.

He studied theatre at the Sorbonne-Nouvelle where he met Director . The latter offered him to play Othello at the 2008 Avignon Festival.

Years later, he decided to focus on solo performance. His first show, One Man Costaud was played at the Paris Apollo théâtre and at the Palais des Glaces in 2015.

A die-hard supporter of Paris Saint Germain, he created Coach Muaka, an imaginary character who comments and depicts PSG and French National Soccer Selection games on social media and at his shows in 2015.

In 2016, Jean-Claude Muaka  joined the cast of the Jamel Comedy Club on TV, and toured.

Career

Shows 

 2015: One Man Costaud
 2019: Ce soir ou jamais

Movies 

 2017: Sous le même toit
 2019: Anna

Notes and references 
 Christophe Lacaze-Eslous, Coupe de France : Jean-Claude Muaka enchaîne les passes et les vannes, Le Parisien
 Boris Colombet, Jean-Claude Muaka en One Man Costaud, France-Antilles
 

French stand-up comedians
French male stage actors
French people of Democratic Republic of the Congo descent
1986 births
Living people
21st-century French male actors
French male comedians